The Karachi Stock Exchange has launched the KSE-30 Index with base value of 10,000 points, formally implemented from Friday, September 1, 2006. 

The main feature of this index that makes it different from other indices are:

 KSE-30 index is based only on the free-float of shares, rather than on the basis of paid-up capital.
 The other indices in Karachi Stock Exchange represents total return of the market. That is, when a company announces a dividend, the other indices at KSE are not reduced/adjusted for that amount of dividend (whether cash or bonus).Whereas, KSE-30 Index is adjusted for dividends and right shares.

At the end of 24 December 2014, KSE-30 Index reached its highest ever level of 20,830.07.

See also
 KSE 100 Index
 KMI 30 Index

References

External links
Bloomberg.com
Pak Stock Exchange

Pakistani stock market indices
Pakistan Stock Exchange